The Devil's Flower is a 2010 Russian romantic fantasy film directed by Ekaterina Grokhovskaya.

Plot
The main heroine of the picture Polina is pursued by strange dreams, in which she is invited to go through a living flower on the doors of an ancient castle. Trying to figure out what that means, Polina turns to her friend, fortune teller Nastya. Having visited together the archive of the local library, they steal an old book there, which contains a description of the story that Polina sees in her dreams. At the same time, some pages of the book are initially empty, with scenes from the dreams and life of Polina appearing on them as events unfold. The second character of Polina's dreams is a dark horseman, beckoning her to follow him through the flower, and whom she saw while awake in a forest.

At the same time Polina meets with engineer Sasha and tells him about her disturbing dreams. Their relationship develops and when they have a disagreement, Polina, wandering around the city, meets the man who was the dark horseman in her dreams. She sits down in his car and goes with him to that castle. At the spot, the man gives her a white dress which she should change into and places her on the altar with the intention of serving her as a human sacrifice.

Sasha, who is asked for help by fortune teller Nastya, manages to notice how Polina leaves with a stranger and follows them by taxi After getting into the castle, Sasha fights against the man in black, and as a result he manages at first to gouge the stranger's eye and then to drop the adversary from an extreme height with him plunging into the surrounding stakes. As soon as the heart of the black rider is pierced by the stakes, Polina picks herself up but loses control and almost falls down to the defeated rider, but Sasha succeeds in the last moment to grab her and draw her back to safety.

Cast
Olga Khokhlova — Polina
Sergey Krapiventsev — Sasha
Oleg Sukachenko — dark horseman
Irina Kupchenko — Polina's mother
Natalya Naumova — Nastya
Natalia Rudova — girl from the party
Anna Emelyanova — girl from the party
Marina Golub
Andrey Kharitonov
Roman Pakhomov

Production
Filming was mainly conducted in Moscow and the final scenes were shot in a medieval castle in Poland.

Release and reception
The film was unsuccessful with the critics and at the box-office.

References

External links
 

Russian horror films
2010s romantic fantasy films
Russian romantic drama films
2010 romantic drama films
2010s teen fantasy films
2010 films
Russian dark fantasy films
2010s Russian-language films